Latitude Hill is a hill on North Island in the Houtman Abrolhos.

References

North Island (Houtman Abrolhos)
Mountains of Western Australia